In human mitochondrial genetics, Haplogroup Y is a human mitochondrial DNA (mtDNA) haplogroup.

Origin
Haplogroup Y is a descendant of haplogroup N9.

Distribution
Haplogroup Y has been found with high frequency in many indigenous populations who live around the Sea of Okhotsk, including approximately 66% of Nivkhs, approximately 43% of Ulchs, approximately 40% of Nanais, approximately 21% of Negidals, and approximately 20% of Ainus. It is also fairly common among indigenous peoples of the Kamchatka Peninsula (Koryaks, Itelmens) and among certain Austronesian peoples (especially groups closely related to Native Taiwanese).

The distribution of haplogroup Y in populations of the Malay Archipelago contrasts starkly with the absence or extreme rarity of this clade in populations of continental Southeast Asia in a manner reminiscent of haplogroup E. However, the frequency of haplogroup Y fades more smoothly away from its maximum around the Sea of Okhotsk in Northeast Asia, being found in approximately 2% of Koreans and in South Siberian and Central Asian populations with an average frequency of 1%.

The Y2 subclade has been observed in 40% (176/440) of a large pool of samples from Nias people in western Indonesia, ranging from a low of 25% (3/12) among the Zalukhu subpopulation to a high of 52% (11/21) among the Ho subpopulation.

Table of frequencies of mtDNA haplogroup Y

Subclades
Haplogroup Y has been divided into two primary subclades, Y1 and Y2. In a study published in 2016, mtDNA haplogroup Y1a was observed in an Ulchi sampled in Nizhniy Gavan, Lower Amur, whereas mtDNA haplogroup Y2a1 was observed in an Igorot from Mountain Province, Luzon Island, Philippines (sampled in Singapore) and in a Hawaiian.

Y1 predominates in the Northeast Asian range of haplogroup Y, which is centered on the Sea of Okhotsk. Y1* has been observed in two Uyghurs, a Minnan Han Chinese in Taiwan, and a Khamnigan. Y1a* has been observed in a Nivkh, in a Buryat in Zabaikal, in Mongolia, in a Daur and a Han Chinese in China, and in Tibet. Y1a with an additional T16189C mutation is common among the Nivkhs and among several Tungusic peoples (Hezhen in the PRC, Ulchi, Udegey, Even in the basins of the Kolyma and Indigirka rivers). Y1a1 has been observed in at least five Uyghurs, a Kyrgyz, a Buryat in Buryat Republic, a Hezhen in China, an Udegey, three Evenks in Taimyr, and two Yakuts in central Sakha Republic. Y1a2 has been observed in Koryaks and in an Even in Kamchatka. Y1a appears to be a relatively young haplogroup, with an age of 6,000 (95% CI 3,300 <-> 8,800) years estimated from 13 complete genomes (Ulchi x 6, Nivkh x 3, Koryak x 2, Even x 1, Mongolian x 1); however, this estimate may be relevant only for the TMRCA of Y1a2 and most Y1a* and Y1a-T16189C haplotypes, as it is not certain that any of the Y1a mtDNAs that have been analyzed belong to the Y1a1 clade. (However, YFull has estimated the TMRCA of the entire Y1a clade, including all tabulated members of Y1a1 and Y1a* as well as Y1a+T16189C and Y1a2, to be 6,300 [95% CI 3,800 <-> 9,800] ybp, so the addition of members of the Y1a1 subclade apparently does not significantly affect the estimate of the time to most recent common ancestor of the Y1a clade.)  Y1b has been observed in a Tatar from Buinsk, Y1b1 has been observed in China, and Y1b1a has been observed in China and in Japan. The age of the entire Y1 clade has been estimated from 17 complete genomes (including the 13 aforementioned members of the Y1a clade plus one Japanese, one Chinese, and one Tatar member of the Y1b clade plus one Khamnigan member of Y1*) to be 12,400 (95% CI 5,900 <-> 19,100) ybp.

Y2a predominates in the Southeast Asian range of haplogroup Y, which is centered on the Philippines and Sumatra. However, Y2b has been observed in Japan and in a Buryat, and Y2* has been observed in Chinese, Japanese, and Khamnigan samples.

Tree
This phylogenetic tree of haplogroup Y subclades is based on the paper by Mannis van Oven and Manfred Kayser Updated comprehensive phylogenetic tree of global human mitochondrial DNA variation and subsequent published research.

Y
Y1
Y1a
Y1b
Y2
Y2a
Y2b

See also

Genealogical DNA test
Genetic genealogy
Human mitochondrial genetics
Population genetics

References

External links
Ian Logan's Mitochondrial DNA Site
Mannis van Oven's Phylotree

Y